Samuel "Sam" A. Malcolmson (born 2 April 1947 in Scotland) is a former footballer who represented New Zealand.

UK career

Hailing from Dalbeattie, Malcolmson served in the Royal Navy  and in 1969, whilst stationed at R.N.A.S. Culdrose in Cornwall, he played 14 games (5 goals) for Falmouth Town. He went on to play for Airdrieonians, Queen of the South and Albion Rovers in Scotland before emigrating in 1974.

NZ career

He was a capable defender who liked to attack and was very strong in the air, he was often used as a striker and scored more than 50 goals in New Zealand National League.

Malcolmson scored on his full All Whites international debut in a 2–0 win over Burma on 13 September 1976 and went on to represent the All Whites at the 1982 FIFA World Cup finals in Spain, his sole appearance at the tournament being his last game for New Zealand in a 5–2 defeat against his native Scotland. In doing so became the second of three players with Queen of the South among his ex-clubs to travel to the World Cup finals after George Hamilton and before Bernie Slaven. Malcolmson is the only one of the three to actually play at the finals.
Including friendlies and unofficial games against club sides, Malcolmson played 32 times for his adopted country, scoring 5 goals, ending his international playing career with 15 official A-international caps and 2 goals to his credit.

After playing
In 2013, Malcolmson became a founding committee member of the independent group Friends of Football

References

External links

"World Cup Doonhamers" on www.qosfc.com

1947 births
Living people
People from Dalbeattie
Scottish footballers
New Zealand association footballers
Scottish emigrants to New Zealand
Falmouth Town A.F.C. players
Airdrieonians F.C. (1878) players
Portadown F.C. players
Queen of the South F.C. players
Albion Rovers F.C. players
Wellington United players
Stop Out players
Eastern Suburbs AFC players
Manurewa AFC players
East Coast Bays AFC players
1982 FIFA World Cup players
New Zealand international footballers
Association football defenders
New Zealand expatriate sportspeople in England